The 1908 Victorian Football League (VFL) season was the twelfth season of the VFL. The season saw 137 Australian rules footballers make their senior VFL debut and a further 39 players transfer to new clubs having previously played in the VFL.

Summary

Debuts

References

Australian rules football records and statistics
Australian rules football-related lists
1908 in Australian rules football